Calumma andringitraense is a species of chameleon endemic to Madagascar. It was originally considered a subspecies of Calumma gastrotaenia, the Perinet chameleon.

Distribution and habitat
Calumma andringitraense has a geographic range of only 1,220 square kilometers (471 square miles) in southwestern Madagascar. It is known to inhabit Andohahela National Park, Andringitra National Park, and Kalambatritra Reserve; this fragmented distribution may be a result of the species' narrow preferences of habitat. For the most part, it is restricted to intact, relatively high-altitude humid forests.

Conservation and threats
Due to its small and fragmented range and ongoing habitat loss, Calumma andringitraense is listed as endangered by the  International Union for Conservation of Nature. Perhaps as a result of its limited population and other factors, illegal trade in it is virtually nonexistent. The population of the species is decreasing.

References

Further reading
Böhme W. 1997. "Eine neue Chamäleonart aus der Calumma gastrotaenia - Verwandschaft Ost-Madagaskars." Herpetofauna 19 (107): 5-10. (in German).
Brygoo E-R, Blanc CP, Domergue CA. 1972. "Notes sur les Chameleo de Madagascar. X. Deux nouveaux Caméléons des hauts sommets de Madagascar: C. capuroni n. sp. et C. gastrotaenia andringitraensis n. subsp." Bulletin du Muséum d'histoire naturelle, Paris, Series 3, 56 (42): 601 -613. (in French).
Glaw F, Vences M. 1994. A Fieldguide to the Amphibians and Reptiles of Madagascar, Second edition. Cologne, Germany: Vences & Glaw Verlags/Serpents Tale. 480 pp. . (in English).
Lutzmann N, Lutzmann H. 2004. "Das grammatikalische Geschlecht der Gattung Calumma (Chamaeleonidae) und die nötigen Annpassungen einiger Art- und Unterartbezeichnungen." Reptilia (Münster) 9 (48): 4-5. (in German).

andringitraense
Endemic fauna of Madagascar
Reptiles described in 1972
Taxa named by Édouard-Raoul Brygoo
Taxa named by Charles Pierre Blanc
Taxa named by Charles Domergue

Reptiles of Madagascar